Backbone, is a 1975 Yugoslavian drama film directed by Vlatko Gilić. It was entered into the 1977 Cannes Film Festival.

Cast
 Dragan Nikolić as Pavle Gvozdenović
 Predrag Laković as Pepi
 Mira Banjac
 Milutin Butković
 Stanislava Janjic as Ana
 Seka Sablić (as Jelisaveta Sabljic)
 Nada Skrinjar as Bolesnica
 Miroljub Lešo
 Neda Spasojević
 Đorđe Jelisić
 Renata Ulmanski as Woman from kafana
 Slađana Matović as Jelena
 Dragomir Felba
 Danilo "Bata" Stojković as Man from kafane
 Jelena Čvorović (as Jelena Radovic)
 Jelka Utornik
 Taško Načić

References

External links

1975 films
1975 drama films
Serbo-Croatian-language films
Serbian drama films
Films scored by Walter Scharf
Yugoslav drama films
Films set in Yugoslavia